Unione Sportiva Sestese Calcio is an Italian association football club located in Sesto Calende, Lombardy. It currently plays in Eccellenza Lombardy.

History 
During the fascism the National Afterwork Organization transformed the club into the factory squad of the local aircraft industries SIAI-Marchetti, which funded three years of Serie C.

Sestese was promoted to Serie D after finishing first in Group A of the Eccellenza Lombardy in the 2006–07 season. In the season 2009–10 it was relegated to Eccellenza.

Colors and badge 
Its colors are white and blue.

References

External links
 Official homepage

Football clubs in Lombardy
Serie C clubs
1913 establishments in Italy